Brigid R. Heywood, born 1956 or 1957, is a British/Australian academic and biological scientist. She was Vice-Chancellor of the University of New England (UNE) in Australia from 2019 until she resigned after criminal charges were laid against her in 2022.

Early life and education 
Heywood is a native of Hull in Northern England. Her father gave her a microscope at age 10. Early scholarly inspiration came from chemist Robert Williams, an Emeritus Professor at the University of Oxford. In 1979, Heywood earned a Bachelor of Science (Hons) in Biological Sciences from the University of Manchester and a PhD focused on Biomineralisation from the University of Liverpool in 1984.

Academic career 
Although she did not have a chemistry degree, Heywood was appointed a professor of chemistry on the strength of her research credentials in 1996 to a personal Chair in Inorganic Materials Chemistry at Keele University in Staffordshire, United Kingdom while in her early thirties. She held academic leadership positions as Head of the Chemistry Department (1997–99), Head of the School of Chemistry and Physics (1999-02) and Director of the Office of Research and Enterprise at Keele University from 2003–2005.

She was then appointed Professor of Chemistry at The Open University from 2005-2011. Heywood served as Assistant Vice-Chancellor (Research) at Massey University, New Zealand in 2011, and later Assistant Vice-Chancellor Research, Academic and Enterprise from 2013–2015. She was Deputy Vice-Chancellor (Research) at the University of Tasmania prior to her appointment in 2019 as the 14th Vice-Chancellor of the University of New England (UNE), Australia. The third woman in this role, following Ingrid Moses (1997–2005) and Annabelle Duncan (2014–2019), However, UNE accepted her resignation in August 2022 after she was formally charged with allegedly assaulting a teenage schoolgirl at a club in Armidale on 8 March 2022.

Scholarly contribution 
The Guardian newspaper summarises her substantive scholarly focus and contribution as follows: "her research career developed out of the discipline transition from applied biological sciences to materials chemistry fostered by an initial interest in the controlled growth of inorganic crystals in biological systems, biomineralisation.   Subsequently, the application of crystal science to issues ranging from normal and dystrophic mineralisation processes, structure-function relationships in inorganic materials, the development of novel strategies to control crystal formation and the formation of novel, functional inorganic-organic hybrids for drug delivery have evolved as key research topics within her multidisciplinary research programme".

In March 2021, Heywood had 72 documents listed in Scopus, with an h index of 33 and 5273 citations.

Selected publications

Statutory and board appointments 
In 2020, Heywood was appointed to the New South Wales (NSW) Innovation and Productivity Council of the NSW Treasury This appointment was made by the Governor of NSW for a three-year term.

On 28 September 2021, she was appointed as a member of the Risk & Audit Committee of the Australian Nuclear Science and Technology Organisation (ANSTO), the home of Australia’s most significant landmark and national infrastructure for research. Heywood's term is scheduled to conclude on 27 September 2025.

Personal life 
In 2020, it was reported that Heywood "and her husband enjoy living in New Zealand (where they still own a house) and Australia"; they are often visited by extended family members.

At Armidale Local Court on 26 September 2022, a not guilty plea was entered  on behalf of Heywood to charges relating to "common assault and offensive behaviour near a public place or school". In New South Wales, two years' imprisonment and/or a $5,500 fine is the maximum penalty for common assault. The next scheduled court date was 14 November. Heywood did not appear, so the matter was adjourned until 4 July 2023 for a three-day hearing.

References

Living people
Alumni of the University of Manchester
Alumni of the University of Liverpool
Academics of Keele University
Academic staff of the Massey University
Academic staff of the University of Tasmania
Academic staff of the University of New England (Australia)
Year of birth missing (living people)